Dafra Motos, or Dafra is a Brazilian builder of motorcycles founded in 2007 by Itavema Group.

History 
Dafra Motos was founded in 2007 using the concept "CKD" (completely knocked down) i.e. bringing the disassembled-bikes made by Asian manufacturers Loncin, Lifan and Zongshen and assembling them in Manaus in Brazil, where it maintains its plant.

At the start of production components were overwhelmingly imported from China but after breaking partnership with suppliers, Dafra sought new partners; today Dafra Motorcycles has a partnership with TVS Motor Company of India (third-largest manufacturer of motorcycles in India), Haojue (manufacturer of Suzuki motorcycles in China), BMW, Ducati, MV Agusta, KTM and SYM Motors, seeking improvement of their products.

To meet the domestic market, Dafra built in a factory in the industrial area of Manaus (Amazonas) which has 170,000 m² of land, with 35,000 square meters of buildings. The factory currently has more than 500 employees and annual production capacity of 200,000 motorcycles.

References

External links
 

Manaus
Motorcycle manufacturers of Brazil
Scooter manufacturers
Vehicle manufacturing companies established in 2008
Brazilian brands